Daniel Muñoz de la Nava was the defending champion, but chose not to defend his title.

Mikhail Kukushkin won the title after defeating Steven Diez 6–3, 6–3 in the final.

Seeds

Draw

Finals

Top half

Bottom half

References
 Main Draw
 Qualifying Draw

Hoff Open - Singles
2016